Sunderbani is a town and a notified area committee, about 70 km from Rajouri Town in Rajouri district in the Indian union territory of Jammu and Kashmir.

Geography
It has an average elevation of 633 metres (2,077 feet).

Demographics
 India census, Sunderbani had a population of 10,531. Sunderbani comprises many villages like

The village of Mallah is about 12 km from Sunderbani. Known as the 'mango village', it is known for its Ashram and Educational complex of Atal Akhada Peethadeeshwar Rajguru mahamandaleshwar 1008 Swami Vishwatmanand Saraswati Ji Maharaj  and Satguru Baba Kanshi Giri Ji Maharaj. The last boundary of Sunderbani is Village Basantpur.

Religion
Hinduism is the largest religion in Sunderbani, followed by over 90% of the people. Sikhism is the second-largest religion with 5.4% adherents. Christianity and Islam form 0.56% and 3.59% of the population respectively.

Transport

Air
The nearest airport to Sunderbani is Rajouri Airport, located at a distance of 70 kilometres.

Rail
There is no rail connectivity to Sunderbani. The nearest railway station is Jammu Tawi railway station, located at a distance of 80 kilometres.

Road
The National Highway 144A goes through Sunderbani town.

Education

Colleges
There is a private educational complex consisting of colleges like Swami Vishwatmanand Saraswati Degree college, SVS Paramedical College, SVS BEd College and Guru Gangdev Ji Sanskrit College.
Also, Government has established GDC Sunderbani in the year 2012.
In SSVS Degree College, NCC high achievement cadets (RDC and TSC Camps) names are SUO Mohit Kumar Raina, SUO Sahil Sharma, JUO Rohit Sharma, Govind Sharma and Vikas Verma. They are first RDC holders NCC cadets from this College.

Schools
There are a number of schools in Sunderbani like SGGD Model Higher secondary school, Harsh Niketan Higher secondary school, New public school, Bharat Public school and kendriya vidyalaya B.S.F campus sunderbani

Nearby places of attraction

Shri Mata vaishno devi, katra 
Shri mata Vaishno devi temple is around 74 km from Sunderbani

Shivkhori Temple
Shiv Khori cave is around 45 km away from Sunderbani

Charnot Temple
Charnot Temple is around 8 km away from Sunderbani

Mangla Mata Temple
this temple is around 41 km away from Sunderbani to Nowshera side.

Shree Raghunath Temple Prat
this temple is around 08 km away from Sunderbani.

Baba Bhairav Nath Temple Prat
this temple is around 08 km away from Sunderbani.

Sunderbani Lake
this lake is around 1.5 km away from Sunderbani.

Durga Mata Mandir, Lamman
this mandir is around 2.5 km away from Sunderbani.

Shahdara Sharief, Temple
Shahdara Sharief is around 97 km away from Sunderbani.

Politics

Sh. Ravinder Raina is an ex member of the Legislative Assembly (MLA) affiliated with the Bharatiya Janata Party of Nowshera- Sunderbani (2017)
Sh. Surinder Choudhary is an ex member of the Legislative Council (MLC) affiliated with the Jammu and Kashmir Peoples Democratic Party of Nowshera - Sunderbani
Sh. Radhey Sham Sharma is an ex MLA.
Sh. Ravinder Sharma is an ex MLC in the Indian National Congress.

References

Cities and towns in Rajouri district